Janani may refer to:

 Janani (1993 film), a 1993 Bengali film
 Janani (1999 film), a 1999 Malayalam film
 Janani (2006 film), 2006 Indian film
 Janani (2021 TV series), a 2021 Indian series
 Janani Iyer (born 1987), Indian actress
 Janani Luwum (1922–1977), former Archbishop of the Church of Uganda
 Janani Janmabhumishcha Swargadapi Gariyasi, national motto of Nepal
 "Bande Utkala Janani", state Song of Odisha, India